Atanas Tsanov (28 January 1928 – 28 September 2015) was a Bulgarian footballer. He played in two matches for the Bulgaria national football team from 1948 to 1953. He was also part of Bulgaria's squad for the 1952 Summer Olympics, but he did not play in any matches.

References

External links
 
 

1928 births
2015 deaths
Bulgarian footballers
Bulgaria international footballers
Place of birth missing
Association football defenders
PFC Levski Sofia players